Richard Holdsworth (or Houldsworth, Oldsworth) (1590, in Newcastle-on-Tyne  – 22 August 1649) was an English academic theologian, and Master of Emmanuel College, Cambridge from 1637 to 1643. Although Emmanuel was a Puritan stronghold, Holdsworth, who in religion agreed, in the political sphere resisted Parliamentary interference, and showed Royalist sympathies.

Life

Richard Holdsworth was the son of Richard Holdswourth, Vicar of Newcastle-on-Tyne, and baptised at St Nicholas, Newcastle on 20 December 1590. He entered St. John's College, Cambridge as a scholar in 1607, graduated B.A. in 1610, and became a Fellow in 1613.

He was chaplain to Sir Henry Hobart, 1st Baronet. He was rector of St Peter-le-Poor, London in 1624.

He was in 1629 the first Gresham College divinity lecturer appointed from the Puritan camp; he held the position until 1637. A London reputation brought him the presidency of Sion College in 1639. He became Archdeacon of Huntingdon.

He was a member of the Westminster Assembly. He was Vice-Chancellor of the University of Cambridge, for two years, and Lady Margaret's Professor of Divinity, from 1643. He lost his position as Master of Emmanuel, because of expressed royalist opinions; and was briefly imprisoned by Parliament.

He was appointed Dean of Worcester by the King, in 1647. It is also claimed that the King wanted to appoint him Bishop of Bristol; this is mentioned by Thomas Fuller. Given the wartime conditions, these appointments could have been taken up only with difficulty.

Educational views

He is said to have been a modernizer in education, in the line of Francis Bacon and Comenius, and a proponent of unadorned prose. His students at St. John's included Simonds D'Ewes, whom he instructed by means of a system of note-taking.

He provided John Wallis with an introduction to William Oughtred, steering Wallis towards mathematics (Wallis graduated BA at Emmanuel as Holdsworth arrived).

He was also a bibliophile who amassed a private collection of 10,000 books, bequeathed to the Cambridge University Library. It arrived there in 1664, after a long legal limbo caused by testamentary conditions. It is said to have been the largest private collection of the time in England.

The Directions for a Student in the Universite has been attributed to him. The attribution is questioned by Hill as not certain. This work is a scheme of a four-year classical education.

Notes

Further reading
John A. Trentman, "The Authorship of Directions for a Student in the Universitie," Transactions of the Cambridge Bibliographical Society, vol. 7, no. 2, 1978, pp. 170–183.
Brent L. Nelson, "The Social Context of Rhetoric, 1500-1660," The Dictionary of Literary Biography, Volume 281: British Rhetoricians and Logicians, 1500-1660, Second Series, Detroit: Gale, 2003, pp. 355–377.

External links

1590 births
1649 deaths
Alumni of St John's College, Cambridge
English Calvinist and Reformed theologians
Masters of Emmanuel College, Cambridge
Westminster Divines
People from Newcastle upon Tyne
Fellows of St John's College, Cambridge
Vice-Chancellors of the University of Cambridge
17th-century Calvinist and Reformed theologians
Lady Margaret's Professors of Divinity